Brahima Touré (born 9 September 1989), is an Ivorian footballer who currently plays for Al-Hudood in Iraqi Premier League.

Honours
CS Sfaxien
CAF Confederation Cup: 
Winner: 2008
Runner-up: 2010
North African Cup Winners Cup: 
Winner: 2009
Tunisian Cup: 
Winner: 2009
Finalist: 2010

References

External links
 
 

1989 births
Living people
Ivorian footballers
Association football midfielders
Ivorian expatriate footballers
US Bitam players
CS Sfaxien players
ES Zarzis players
FC Lugano players
FC Locarno players
Stade Gabèsien players
DRB Tadjenanet players
US Tataouine players
Expatriate footballers in Gabon
Expatriate footballers in Tunisia
Expatriate footballers in Sudan
Expatriate footballers in Switzerland
Expatriate footballers in Hungary
Expatriate footballers in Algeria
Expatriate footballers in Egypt
Expatriate footballers in Iraq
Ivorian expatriate sportspeople in Gabon
Ivorian expatriate sportspeople in Tunisia
Ivorian expatriate sportspeople in Sudan
Ivorian expatriate sportspeople in Switzerland
Ivorian expatriate sportspeople in Hungary
Ivorian expatriate sportspeople in Algeria
Ivorian expatriate sportspeople in Egypt
Ivorian expatriate sportspeople in Iraq